Mayran is a commune in the Aveyron department in southern France.

Population

In 2018, the town had 636 inhabitants, down 2.3% compared to 2013 (Aveyron: + 0.55%, France excluding Mayotte: + 1.78%).

Cultural Events and Festivities 
14 and 15 August: Village festival organized by the Mayran Festival Committee.

Places and Monuments 

 Church of Saint Fabien and Saint Sébastien de Mayran
 Chapel of Notre-Dame du Soulié

See also
Communes of the Aveyron department

References

Communes of Aveyron
Aveyron communes articles needing translation from French Wikipedia